Rail transport in Myanmar (then Burma) began in 1877. Three private rail companies were nationalised nineteen years later. During the Japanese occupation of Burma, Allied prisoners of war were forced to build the Burma Railway. Myanmar Railways has expanded its network somewhat since 1988.

1877-1896
Rail transport was introduced in Burma in May 1877 (when Lower Burma was a colony of the United Kingdom and part of British India) with the opening of the Rangoon-to-Prome line by the Irrawaddy Valley State Railway. The  line, following the Irrawaddy River, was built over a three-year period with labour imported from India (particularly the areas affected by the Bihar famine of 1873–74). Unusually for a British colonial railway, it was built to 1,000 mm (3 ft 3 3⁄8 in) metre gauge. In 1884 the Sittang Valley State Railway, a new company, opened a  line along the Sittang River from Rangoon to Toungoo via Pegu. The Irrawaddy line was considered commercially important because it could transport rice from the valley to the main port at Rangoon, and the Sittang line was strategically important because of Toungoo's proximity to the border with Upper Burma (then part of the Ava kingdom). This became evident at the start of the Third Anglo-Burmese War (a year after Sittang line opened) and during the unrest which followed the war. The construction of the two lines cost £1,926,666; the railway was profitable by 1888, returning more than five percent on capital investment. The Mu Valley State Railway was formed after the opening of this section, and construction began on a rail line from Sagaing to Myitkyina connecting Mandalay to Shwebo (1891), Wuntho (1893), Katha (1895) and Myitkyina (1898). This railway created a continuous  line from Rangoon to Myitkyina through the Kachin Hills, except for a ferry crossing of the Irrawaddy at Sagaing. The Inwa Bridge at Sagaing, Burma's only bridge across the Irrawaddy, opened in 1934 with two decks: one for road traffic and one for trains.

1896-1945

In 1896, before the completion of the line to Myitkyina, the rail companies were combined into the publicly owned Burma Railway Company. Between 1898 and 1905, another  of railway was built. A  branch line from the Rangoon-Pyay railroad connected Bassein in the Irrawaddy delta to Rangoon, and the Mandalay-Hsipaw-Lashio railway ran  through the Shan Hills (nearly to the border with China). When it was built, it was the longest such viaduct in the world. The track rises in a continuous 1:40 gradient, and the viaduct (designed by Alexander Rendel & Sons and built by the Pennsylvania Steel Company) was considered an engineering marvel at the time. The Mandalay-Lashio railway was planned to extend to Kunlong (on the border) and into China's Yunnan province, but the plan was abandoned because of the difficult terrain. In 1907, a line opened connecting Pegu and Moulmein (the capital of British Burma before the Second Anglo-Burmese War). The line ran to Martaban, on the Gulf of Martaban at the mouth of the Salween River, and passengers had to take a ferry to Moulmein. Until the Thanlwin Bridge opened in 2006, it was impossible to travel from Rangoon to Moulmein by rail. The Burma Mines Railway, an 80-kilometre (50-mile)  narrow-gauge line from Namyao (on Myanmar Railways' Mandalay-Lashio branch) via Namtu to Bawdwin, was completed in 1908.

After the First World War, a line was built between Moulmein and Ye at the northern end of the Mergui Archipelago. Burma's last major rail line, from Thazi on the Rangoon-Mandalay line to Kalaw (a hill station in the southern Shan State) was built between 1914 and 1918. In 1928, the Burma Railway Company was dissolved; the railways were brought directly under government operation and renamed Burma Railways. Around this time, they began to lose money because of competition from road transport. With return on capital declining, Burma Railways became the country's single largest debt item when the financial separation of India and Burma took place in 1937. The company's coal and rolling stock were imported from India or Britain.

Siam-Burma Railway

The British had long planned to construct a railway line connecting India with Siam (now Thailand) and China. British companies examined the possibility of building a railway from Rangoon to Yunnan to link with a second line from Bangkok to Yunnan, but were unable to obtain financial backing.

When the Japanese occupied Thailand and Burma, they decided to build a railway connecting their Southeast Asian territories with Burma (partly to facilitate the movement of troops and supplies for their planned invasion of India). Since Yunnan was in Chinese hands under Chiang Kai-shek, they looked for a southern route to Burma from Thailand and settled on a line from Ban Pong to Thanbyuzayat across the mountains separating the two countries. Since Thanbyuzayat was on the Moulmein-Ye railway line and Ban Pong connected to Bangkok via Kanchanaburi, the line would provide a direct connection (with a ferry from Moulmein to Martaban) between Bangkok and Rangoon. The Japanese built the lines with Allied prisoners of war, and an estimated 15,000 POWs and 150,000 others died during the construction of the  railway—about 675 deaths per mile. Its construction is depicted in the film, The Bridge on the River Kwai.

1945 to present
By the end of the war,  were operational in four isolated sections. During the postwar era, the rail network was rebuilt. Most routes are single-track, although large portions of the Yangon-Pyay and Yangon-Mandalay routes are double-track.

Improvements
1988: Thaton-Myaingalay (new 36.3-km line)
1989: Dabeyin-Hle Lawin (new 34.6-km line)
1990: Mandalay Circular Railway modernisation (21.8 km)
1992: Shwenyaung-Yauksauk (60.3 km) and Tada-U-Myingyan lines (99.8 km), including a line to Mandalay International Airport
1993: Three lines:
 Aungban-Loi-kaw (164 km), in Kayah State
 Chaung-U-Tawkyaungyi (23.4 km), part of the  Chaung-U-Pakokku-Kalaymyo line
 Minywa-Pakokku (54 km)
1994: Two lines:
 Tada-U-Mandalay International Airport (11.8 km)
 Pakokku-Myaing-Myozoe (55.7 km)
1995: Three lines:
 Myozoe-Zipyar (44.2 km)
 Namsang-Moe-Ne (44.3 km), the first section of the eastern extension of the Thazi-Shwenyaung line
 Tavoy-Yephu (17.2 km), part of the  Mawlamyaing-Ye-Tavoy line
1996: Four lines:
 Gangaw-Natchaung (110.8 km)
 Myitkyina-Nantpaung-Airport (11.7 km)
 Taunggyi-Phamon-Banyin (54.3 km)
 Pyay-Myade/Aunglan-Satthwa (145.4 km), an alternative line to Bagan
1997: Five lines:
 Shwenyaung-Taunggyi (33.5 km)
 Kyaukpadaung-Bagan
 Kaloggyi-Yephu (141.6 km), part of the  Mawlamyaing-Ye-Dawei line
 Taungdwingyi-Magwe (83.8 km)
 Ye-U-Khin-U (25.7 km)
1998: Construction of the 100.8-mile (162.222-km) Ye-Dawei line begins.
2003: The  Okkphosu-Thilawa-Deep Sea Port line opens. The bridge over the Ye River on the Ye-Dawei line opens on 26 November.
2004: The  Hsinbyushin-Chindwin River section of the Mandalay-to-Pakokku line opens. The Yangon-Mandalay line is modernised and double-tracked.
2005: The Ye-Dawei line opens.
2006: The Thanlwin Bridge and Mawlamyine railway station open, connecting the line on the southern bank of the Salween River with the rest of the country. Construction of the 300-mile (483-km) Kyangin-Pakokku line begins.
2007: The Pyinmana-Myohaung section of the Yangon-Mandalay line is double-tracked in November to serve the country's new capital, Naypyidaw.
2008: Construction of the 95-mile (153-km) Katha-Bhamo line begins on 1 January. Construction of the  Kyangin-Okshippin section of the  Kyangin-Pakokku line begins on 1 March, and construction of the 128-mile (205-km) Dawei-Myeik line begins on 6 December. The  Pyawbwe-Phayangasu section of the Yangon-Taunggyi line (via Thazi) opens on 1 December.
2009: The  Tavoy (Dawei)-Myeik,  Namsan-Kengtung and  Pyawbwe-Natmauk-Magway lines open.

See also
 List of railway stations in Myanmar
 Siam-Burma Death Railway - a documentary about Asian labourers (Indian Tamils, Burmese and Javanese) who worked as slaves on the Burma Railway during World War II

References

External links
 , illustrated account of Burma's railways in the 1930s

History of rail transport by country
Rail
Rail transport in Myanmar